David Geary (born 1963) is a Māori writer from New Zealand who is known for his plays The Learners Stand, Lovelocks Dream Run and Pack of Girls. For television he has written for New Zealand series Shortland Street and Jackson's Wharf.

Early years 

Born in Feilding, New Zealand, Geary is Māori and affiliates to the iwi Nga Mahanga and Taranaki. He grew up in Rangiwahia in the Manawatū region, his mother was a teacher. Geary went to Palmerston North Boys' High School, after that he went to university in Wellington (Victoria University of Wellington) and began a law degree although changed to arts. In 1987 Geary graduated from the acting diploma at Toi Whakaari New Zealand Drama School in Wellington. While a student Geary submitted Kandy Cigarettes to the 1988 New Zealand Playwrights’ Workshop under the pseudonym of Kurt Davidson. This was then turned into revue sketches titled Gothic But Staunch and Dry, White and Friendly.

Career 
In 1991 the full-length play by Geary Pack of Girls (Downstage, 1991) became a hit and was picked up in different venues and in the amateur theatrical network in New Zealand. It is a comedy in which a rugby widow forms a women’s rugby team. In 1993 Lovelock’s Dream Run was at The Watershed (Auckland Theatre Company) and also published by Victoria University Press. Geary had brought this earlier to the Australia and New Zealand Playwrights’ Conference in Canberra in 1990 and after the premiere it was also presented in New Zealand and also Australia. 

Other plays of Geary's include The Learner’s Stand premiered at Circa Theatre in 1995, about a student who joins a sheep shearing in rural New Zealand, The King of Stains at (BATS Theatre, 1996). 

Working with others Geary has co-authored Backstage with the Quigleys (BATS Theatre, 1992) and The Rabbiter’s Daughter (BATS Theatre, 1994) with Mick Rose and Tim Spite and Manawa Taua/Savage Hearts (Watershed, 1994) a collaboration with Theatre at Large. Ruapehu, one half of a double bill with Fiona Samuel’s Untitled was created with a group of actors that were presented under the title One Flesh at Downstage Theatre, 1996.

His short story collection, A Man of the People was published in 2003. Poetry and interviews by Geary can be found in Victoria University of Wellington online magazine Turbine.

Geary has a number of screen credits as a writer and actor. On television this includes Shortland Street, Mercy Peak, Jackson's Wharf and Hard Out. In 1993 he co-wrote and co-directed the television documentary The Smell of Money and he wrote the short film Baggage. Geary acted in three seasons of Shark in the Park.

Geary moved to Canada in 2002 and teaches story telling and script writing with First Nation writers.

Recognition 
He was awarded the Dominion Sunday Times Bruce Mason Playwrights’ Award in 1991 and in 1994 won the Adam Foundation Playwrights’ Award for The Learner’s Stand.

In 2008, he was Writer in Residence at Victoria University of Wellington.

References

Living people
New Zealand male dramatists and playwrights
Toi Whakaari alumni
20th-century New Zealand dramatists and playwrights
20th-century New Zealand male writers
21st-century New Zealand dramatists and playwrights
21st-century New Zealand male writers
1963 births
Occasional poets